The Dom (Sanskrit ḍoma, dialectally also Domra, Domba, Domaka, Dombari and variants) are castes, or groups, scattered across India. Dom were a caste of drummer. According to Tantra scriptures, the Dom were engaged in the occupations of singing and playing music. Historically, they were considered an untouchable caste and their traditional occupation was the disposal and cremation of dead bodies. They are in the list of Scheduled caste for Reservation in India in the Indian state of Uttar Pradesh, Bihar, Odisha and West Bengal.

Etymology 
Individuals who live by singing and music were referred to as Dom in Tantric scriptures. According to historian M.P Joshi, the word Duma is connected to the sound of a drum. Its presumed root, ḍom, which is connected with drumming, is linked to damara and damaru, Sanskrit terms for "drum" and the Sanskrit verbal root डम् ḍam- 'to sound (as a drum)', perhaps a loan from Dravidian, e.g. Kannada ḍamāra 'a pair of kettle-drums', and Telugu ṭamaṭama 'a drum, tomtom'.

History
The term dom is mentioned in Tantra scriptures as individuals who live by singing and music. During the reign of the Chand dynasty and Gorkha, all service castes were referred to as Dom and were prohibited from wearing gold and silver ornaments. They had to work as palanquin bearers, but they were prohibited from using palanquins at their weddings. They had to live in separate villages with different cremation sites and water sources. They had to bury the dead cows of others of which they ate flesh. During the British period, the British prohibited these discriminative practices. However British also had prejudice against the Doms with their racial theory. Social activist Lala Lajpat Rai and dalit leader Khusi Ram sought to reject low caste status and introduced the term Shilpkar to replace the prjorative Dom. They conducted purification rituals of Arya Samaj in which shilkars wore sacred threads (Janeu) and were allowed to use a palanquin in their wedding. Since then, in Uttarakhand, the Shilpkar replaced Dom in the official category. But it has done little to reduce the social stigma in the central Himalaya region.

Many nomadic and peripatetic groups in Uttar Pradesh are said to be of Dom origin such as the Bangali, Bhantu, Bazigar, Habura, Kanjar, and Sansi. It could also be that the term Dom is generically used to describe any peripatetic nomad, as all of the aforementioned groups are distinct and strictly endogamous. Some speak a dialect or argot of their own, while others speak the prevailing dialect or language.

The Doms were formerly classified as a criminal tribe under the Criminal Tribes Acts of the British Raj.

Occupations

Hunza valley
The people are called Bericho, Dom, or Doma. The Dom identity developed out of their work as musicians. They are a heterogeneous group, descended from a number of families that took up service with the various local rulers. The Dom belong to the Nizari Ismaili sect in Hunza.

Uttarakhand
Dom were engaged in occupation of singing and playing music in Uttarakhand. They were also engaged in disposal of dead animals.

Delhi
Dom were engaged in occupation of beating drums in marriage ceremonies in Delhi of caste hindus. But marriages of high caste are facilities by Brahmin priest where drum is not beaten. In Delhi, Dom women facilities marriages of Bhangi caste by singing and drum beating as Brahmin not facilities marriages of Bhangi caste as they are considered untouchable.

Chhattisgarh
In Jashpur district of Chhattisgarh, Dom were ruler from 16th century to 18th century until the defeat of king Raibhan of Dom dynasty by Sujan Rai of Sonpur who established Jashpur State.

Varanasi
In Varanasi, the city in Uttar Pradesh, the Dom perform the most important task of cremation of dead bodies. According to puranic legend, Raja Harishchandra was purchased by Kallu Dom and Harishchandra was working under him. But According to Purana, Harishchandra was purchased by a Chandaala and employed in cremation ground.

Present Circumstances
The traditional occupation of Dom was making musical instruments and households items of bamboo. Still they make musical instruments and  households items of bamboo. But due to advent of the electronic music such as DJ, their sale of musical instruments has dwindled.

Demographics
There are around 706,000 Doms in Odisha.

Doms numbered 316,337 at the 2001 census and were 1.7 percent of the scheduled caste population of West Bengal. The same census found overall 46.0 percent of Doms (aged 7 and up) were literate. Along gender lines, 58.9 percent of males and 32.6 percent of females were found by the census to be literate.

The 2011 Census of India for Uttar Pradesh showed the Dom as a Scheduled Caste with a population of 110,353.

Official Classification
Dom are listed as Scheduled Caste for Reservation in India in Indian state of Uttar Pradesh, Bihar, Odisha and West Bengal.

See also 
 Dom people
 Heera Dom

References

External links 

Dombari acrobats
Government program geared towards Dombaris
Dombari language speakers as listed in India

Dom in Bangladesh
Dom in Pakistan
Dom in India
Ethnic groups in India
Ethnic groups in Bangladesh
Dalit communities
Shudra castes
Scheduled Castes of Uttar Pradesh
Scheduled Castes of Tamil Nadu
Scheduled Castes of Bihar
Scheduled Castes of West Bengal
Scheduled Castes of Jharkhand
Scheduled Castes of Odisha
Scheduled Castes of Assam
Scheduled Castes of Madhya Pradesh
Scheduled Castes of Chhattisgarh